Alf Linder (July 28, 1907 – December 21, 1983) was a Swedish organist, renowned for his frequent radio broadcasts and his teaching at the Stockholm Conservatory.

Life
Linder was born in Hammerö, near Karlstad on July 28, 1907. He studied organ with Claes Rendahl and Otto Nordlund (organists of Karlstad cathedral) and is reported to have learned the complete organ works of Bach by the age of ten.  In 1924 he auditioned, unsuccessfully, to study organ at the Stockholm conservatory with Gustaf Hägg. He was accepted into the conservatory the following year and became the first organ student of the newly appointed organ professor Otto Olsson. His repertoire during his studies at the conservatory included Bach's Piece d'Orgue, Olsson's Prelude and Fugue in C# minor and Widor's Symphonie Romane. He passed the organist's exam in 1927 and the church music exam in 1933.

In 1938-1940 Linder traveled several times to Leipzig to study organ with Günther Ramin, studies that influenced him greatly. He later described the experience in  the program notes of a 1977 recording:

When I made my debut recital, in the Gustaf Vasa Church in Stockholm in 1933, I had included this work [The Bach Prelude and Fugue in D-major (BWV 532)] in my program, and I performed it in the way in which Bach was performed at the time. When I came to Günther Ramin in Lepizig, I played the D-major Fugue for him, almost as I had played it at my debut recital in Stockholm (five years earlier). After that, Ramin played the same piece his way, in a light and airy manner with only 8', 4' and 1' registers. It was a completely new experience for me, bot in terms of sound and technique.

Linder made his first recordings for Swedish Radio in January and March 1940 and he was appointed organist of the Stockholm Concert Hall the same year, a position he held until 1954. He became the organist of Oscar's Church, Stockholm in 1943 and held that position until his death in 1983. There he arranged 45 minute organ recitals on Saturday nights and played the complete works of Bach within this recital series 1944-1945. He taught organ at the Stockholm Conservatory starting in 1938 and became professor in 1958. In 1954 he became a member of the Royal Swedish Academy of Music.

He died December 21, 1983, in Stockholm.

Selected recordings
 1980 Organ works by Hilding Rosenberg
 1975 Organ works by Max Reger
 1959  The complete organ works of Dietrich Buxtehude

Notes

Biography
 
 

1907 births
1983 deaths
Swedish classical organists
Male classical organists
Royal College of Music, Stockholm alumni
20th-century classical musicians
20th-century organists
20th-century Swedish male musicians
20th-century Swedish musicians